Carex pichinchensis is a tussock-forming species of perennial sedge in the family Cyperaceae. It is native to north-western parts of South America.

See also
List of Carex species

References

pichinchensis
Plants described in 1816
Taxa named by Carl Sigismund Kunth
Flora of Bolivia
Flora of Colombia
Flora of Ecuador
Flora of Peru